Petrogenia is a monotypic genus of flowering plants belonging to the family Convolvulaceae. The only species is Petrogenia repens.

Its native range is Texas to Northeastern Mexico.

References

Convolvulaceae
Monotypic Convolvulaceae genera